In May 2020, Iran sent five oil tankers—Forest, Fortune, Petunia, Faxon, and Clavel—all under the flag of Iran, to Venezuela, followed by another tanker, Golsan, sent in June 2020. Since the collapse of Venezuela's oil refining industry and 2019 sanctions imposed by the United States preventing fuel suppliers from sending gasoline to Venezuela, the country is experiencing a chronic shortage of gasoline. The Iranian tankers sent in May carried 1.53 million barrels of Iranian gasoline, while Golsan was expected to contain 190,000 to 345,000 barrels. All the tankers were loaded at a gasoline refinery near Bandar Abbas, and were escorted by the Venezuelan navy after U.S. threats of intervention.

Background

The decline in the Venezuela's oil refining industry has accelerated since 2016 because of underinvestment and mismanagement. Also, since late 2019, the U.S. has prevented sending gasoline by Venezuela's fuel suppliers. The own once-formidable refining industry of Venezuela cannot produce gasoline and country is facing a chronic shortage of gasoline. Fuel shortages have been common in Venezuela. In 2020, the shortages reached Caracas, sparking mile-long lines at filling stations. Due to shortages, the price of fuel in the black market reached $10 a gallon. Venezuelan petrol prices were once among the world's cheapest. Fuel prices are subsidized, which cost the government a total of $18 million per year. With both Venezuela and Iran under economic pressure, the two countries have developed "more political and symbolic" ties.

The Iranian shoot-down of an American surveillance drone over the strategic Strait of Hormuz escalated US–Iran tensions at sea to the highest point in June 2019.

Gasoline export
Fortune was the first tanker to arrive in Venezuela's territorial waters on 24 May 2020. On 26 May, the second Iranian oil tanker, Forest, arrived in the Venezuelan port of El Palito. The third tanker, Petunia, arrived at the Venezuelan's exclusive economic zone on 26 May. The fourth tanker, Faxon, arrived on 29 May. The fifth tanker, Clavel, entered Venezuela's territorial waters on 31 May. All the tankers were escorted by the Venezuelan naval and air forces.

Payment
Iranian ambassador to Venezuela, Hojjatollah Soltani, told the Islamic Republic News Agency that Iran "has fully received payments of the gasoline exported to Venezuela." A member of Iran's Expediency Council, Ali Aqamohammadi, said that the money received from the gasoline sold to Venezuela has been deposited in the treasury as a credit obtained by the National Iranian Oil Refining and Distribution Company and the Oil Ministry.

Controversies
The U.S. said it was considering how it would respond to the shipments. The presidents of both Iran and Venezuela issued warnings about U.S. attempts to block the fuel delivery. Iranian foreign minister Mohammad Javad Zarif also wrote to António Guterres, Secretary-General of the United Nations, to alert him to the possible dispatch of U.S. troops to the Caribbean to block the operation. Also, Abbas Araghchi, Iran's Deputy Foreign Minister for Political Affairs summoned the Swiss ambassador who looks after U.S. interests in Iran to warn the U.S. against interfering with its tankers. Ahmad Sobhani, a former Iranian ambassador to Caracas, described the U.S. decision not to interfere in the gasoline delivery as indicating Iran's "deterrent power."

Francisco J. Monaldi, a Venezuelan oil expert at Rice University in Houston, said that the shipments of the five tankers are far lower than the required amount to resolve Venezuela's severe gas shortage. Experts say that with the shortages In Venezuela, the gasoline imports will last only a few weeks.

Aftermath 
President of Venezuela Nicolás Maduro, said, "Thanks Iran" in a tweet after the first Iranian oil tanker arrived in Venezuela. "Only the brotherhood of free peoples will save us," he added.

The United States Department of the Treasury imposed sanctions on four Venezuelan oil companies and the five Iranian ship captains who delivered gasoline to Venezuela. Venezuelan Foreign Minister Jorge Arreaza called the sanctions “an excess of arrogance” and “more proof of the Trump hawks’ hatred of all Venezuelans.”

Previously the price of petrol in Venezuela was set to less than the equivalent of a US penny a gallon, though scarcity generated a black market where fuel was sold at prices of up to US$10 per gallon. Following the shipments, the Maduro administration raised prices to about US$1.90 a gallon.

On 2 July 2020, the Trump administration filed a lawsuit to seize four Iranian gasoline tankers headed for Venezuela. While the lawsuit would only apply in US territorial waters, the administration hoped other countries would similarly block the fuel shipment.

On 28 August 2020, Alex Saab's lawyers stated that he was on a mission to Iran as a special envoy of Maduro to negotiate fuel and humanitarian supplies at the time of his arrest.

Confiscation of second gasoline shipment 
On 14 August 2020, the United States Department of Justice reported that it had confiscated four oil tankers carrying Iranian fuel that were heading to Venezuela with 1,116 million barrels of oil. Iran's ambassador to Venezuela, Hojjatollah Soltani, said the reports that Iranian tankers had been captured were "another lie and psychological warfare" by the United States. "The ships are not Iranian, and neither the owners nor its flag have anything to do with Iran," he said on Twitter. On 18 August, Iranian Oil Minister Bijan Namdar Zangeneh stated that "These shipments included Iranian gasoline that had been sold in its entirety to Venezuela and for which the payment had been made to Iran, so the US has not confiscated property from the Islamic Republic of Iran, but property from Venezuela."

Second shipment 
On 28 September 2020, Forest the first of a group of three tankers carrying Iranian fuel entered Venezuela's exclusive economic zone around 8:05 a.m. On 30 September 2020, the Fortune reached Venezuela's exclusive economic zone at 1:45 a.m., after its fellow vessel Forest docked at El Palito port. On 4 October, the Flaxon, the final tanker in a flotilla of three Iranian fuel tankers (brought some 820,000 barrels of fuel) docked at eastern Venezuela's Guaraguao port, at the time, Maduro announced a new rationing plan, set to begin on Monday 5 October.

See also
 Iran-Venezuela relations
 Petroleum industry in Iran
 Iran fuel export to Lebanon

References

2020 controversies
2020 in Iran
2020 in politics
2020 in Venezuela
Crisis in Venezuela
Iran–Venezuela relations
Maritime history of Venezuela
Petroleum economics
PDVSA